Manuel Sánchez López (born 13 April 1988), known as Manolín, is a Spanish professional footballer. Mainly a defensive midfielder, he can also play as a central defender.

Club career
Born in Córdoba, Andalusia, Manolín graduated from Córdoba CF's youth academy, and made his debut as a senior with Écija Balompié in 2007, in Segunda División B. On 2 August 2009, he moved to Polideportivo Ejido also of the third division.

On 31 August 2010, Manolín returned to the Blanquiverdes, being assigned to the reserves who competed in Tercera División. In the summer of 2011 he moved back to division three, signing for CF La Unión.

Manolín remained in the third tier the following years, representing CD Guijuelo, La Hoya Lorca CF and SD Huesca. He appeared in 38 matches and scored two goals during the season with the latter club, as it returned to Segunda División after a two-year absence.

Manolín made his professional debut on 22 August 2015 at the age of 27, playing the full 90 minutes in a 2–3 home loss against Deportivo Alavés. On 10 January of the following year, after terminating his contract, he joined CA Osasuna also in the second division.

On 23 June 2016, after achieving promotion to La Liga as a starter in the play-offs, Manolín was released and signed with second division side AD Alcorcón. On 20 December, after appearing rarely, he became a free agent and joined fellow league team UCAM Murcia CF three days later.

On 20 July 2017, Manolín agreed to a deal at Elche CF. He won promotion to the second division at the end of his debut campaign, contributing 34 games and four goals to the feat. 

Manolín left the Estadio Manuel Martínez Valero on 28 August 2020, after another promotion.

References

External links

1988 births
Living people
Footballers from Córdoba, Spain
Spanish footballers
Association football defenders
Association football midfielders
Association football utility players
Segunda División players
Segunda División B players
Tercera División players
Écija Balompié players
Polideportivo Ejido footballers
Córdoba CF B players
CF La Unión players
CD Guijuelo footballers
Lorca FC players
SD Huesca footballers
CA Osasuna players
AD Alcorcón footballers
UCAM Murcia CF players
Elche CF players